The Riding Kid is a 1931 American Western film directed by Jack Irwin and starring Buddy Roosevelt, Jean Kay and Fred Church. The title is sometimes spelled The Ridin' Kid.

It was an independent production by the Poverty Row-based Syndicate Pictures.

Cast
 Buddy Roosevelt as John Denton aka The Ridin' Kid 
 Jean Kay as Miss Barton 
 Fred Church as Sam Eldridge 
 William Bertram as Mark Perdue 
 Sam Tittley as Tom Barton 
 LaVerne Haag as Mrs. Barton 
 Nick Dunray as Pedro 
 Mary Martin as The Cook

Plot
A cattle baron (Perdue) hires The Riding Kid and Pedro to drive out farmers so that he can buy their land. However, the Kid and Pedro side with the farmers, and the Kid falls in love with Miss Barton.

References

Bibliography
 Michael R. Pitts. Poverty Row Studios, 1929–1940: An Illustrated History of 55 Independent Film Companies, with a Filmography for Each. McFarland & Company, 2005.

External links
 

1931 films
1931 Western (genre) films
American Western (genre) films
Films directed by Jack Irwin
1930s English-language films
1930s American films